Robert Brady (born 1946) is an American modernist sculptor who works in ceramics and wood.  Born in Reno, Nevada, he has made his home in the San Francisco Bay Area for many decades. Brady is a multi-faceted artist who works in  ceramics, wood, painting, and illustration, and is best known for his abstract figurative sculptures. Brady came out of the California Clay movement, and the Bay Area Arts scene of the 1950s and 1960s, which includes artists such as Peter Voulkos, Viola Frey, Stephen de Staebler, and Robert Arneson who was his mentor and teacher in college.

Education 
During his senior year in high school, Brady was trying to fill an elective requirement at the last minute when he enrolled in a pivotal arts and crafts class. He credits his teacher, Tom Tucker, with changing the direction of his life by inspiring his future career in ceramics. After high school, Brady attended the California College of Arts and Crafts (CCAC, currently known as California College of the Arts, or CCA) in Oakland, California, from 1964 to 1968, and received his BFA in 1969. After graduating he did a short stint in the United States Navy, but was still unsure of where his future lay when he got out, so spent some time painting houses in order to support himself and his first wife. A chance encounter with an article on famous ceramic artist Isamu Noguchi reignited the fire Brady previously felt for clay, and he immediately switched gears, deciding to go back to school to receive a master's degree from the University of California in Davis.

During his time at UC Davis, Brady learned under acclaimed artists Robert Arneson and Manuel Neri. Later, while working at CCAC as a guest artist and instructor in 1978, Brady learned the art of Raku during a workshop from Hal Riegger[1], (author and pioneer of Raku in the U.S.), and subsequently began teaching those workshops alongside Riegger out in the California desert.

Brady first gained critical acclaim right after leaving school, when he caught the attention of some well-known art collectors during his first solo show. Those collectors were impressed by his 5-foot and 6-foot coil-built vessels; soon Brady's work began appearing in decor and fashion magazines. This exposure was an instrumental factor in launching his professional art career.

Materials and methods 
Brady initiated his career in the ceramic arts, by investigating and experimenting with form and color, including Raku glazes, polychromy, oil pastels and mixed-media. In his smaller earthenware vessels,  he tested the effects of pigmented clays and monotype printing methods on the clay. In making his large scale, and semi-abstract, figurative work, Brady initially used clay and bronze. However, starting in the late 1980s, he began a transition into using wood. He found the material more suited to creating the large scale, thin and elongated, yet often top-heavy sculptures he was making. These, and many other pieces of his, show an affinity for a very primal and ancient type of folk art which Brady has been exploring for decades.  Including the ceramic, wood, and bronze sculptures, Brady has additionally used a variety of materials and methods to create masks, prints, paintings, and drawings to communicate through his art.

Teaching career 
Brady has enjoyed a long and varied career as a teacher and honored professor of ceramics and art from the mid-1970s well into the early 2000s. His teaching jobs have spanned the U.S. from California to Maine, and Hawaii to Alaska, and overseas teaching opportunities have taken Brady to Japan, Canada, England, Jamaica, and Italy.  His first job as an instructor was in the department of art at California State University, Sacramento (SSU) where he was an associate professor. While at SSU he taught ceramics and drawing from 1975 to 1980, and again from 1982 to 1985.

He also worked at the American River College in Sacramento, California, in 1975, and at the Appalachian Center for Craft in Smithville, Tennessee (a campus of Tennessee Tech School of Art, Craft & Design) (https://www.tntech.edu/craftcenter/), where his wife, artist Sandy Simon, also taught.

Having been a guest instructor/artist/speaker at innumerable schools, art centers, potteries and museums over the years, Brady has generously shared his wealth of knowledge with generations of other artists and art lovers. He has said, “The greatest reward in my career as an artist is the satisfaction of creating and discovery," and, "Being an artist has led to the appreciation and integration of aesthetic awareness in all aspects of my life. I am grateful for the rich and provocative life afforded me by being a member of the arts community."

Collections

Museum work 
Many collections of Brady's artwork can be found around the world. Examples of the work can be found in The Crocker Art Museum (Sacramento, California), the San Francisco Museum of Modern Art (SFMOMA), the Oakland Museum of California (OMCA), the Honolulu Museum of Art, and the Stedelijk Museum (Amsterdam).

Gallery work 
The Stremmel Gallery (https://localwiki.org/reno-sparks/Stremmel_Gallery), Reno, Nevada
The Smithsonian Institution’s Renwick Gallery, Washington, D.C.

Public installations 
Public works of Brady's can be found at The Crocker Art Museum, the di Rosa Preserve in Napa, Ca,  the Los Angeles County Museum of Art (LACMA), as well as in North Carolina, Little Rock, Arkansas, Salt Lake City, Utah, New York, West Palm Beach, Florida, Chicago, Illinois, North Dakota, Sacramento, California, and in Amsterdam.

This artist has no relationship to the Robert Brady Museum (Museo Robert Brady) in Cuernavaca, Mexico founded by a different Robert Brady (1928–1986).

Recognition 
Brady has received multiple fellowships from the National Endowment of the Arts in 1981, 1988, 1989, and 2008. He was also elected Fellow of the American Craft Council in 2007, and has been awarded the title Professor Emeritus for Sacramento State University where he taught for 33 years.

Further reading 
Riegger, Hal. Raku, Art, and Technique, 1979. London

References
 Driesbach, Janice and T. H. Garver, Robert Brady, A Survey Exhibition, 1989. Sacramento, Ca: Crocker Art Museum.
 http://www.artnet.com/artists/robert-david-brady/biography-links Robert David Brady on ArtNet 
 Amsterdam (Netherlands). Stedelijk Museum and Slivka, Rose West Coast ceramics : Keramisch Beeldhouwerk uit de Verenigde Staten : [Exhibition Catalog]. Stedelijk Museum, [Amsterdam, 1979.
 Garver, Thomas H. and John Fitz Gibbon (essayists), et al. “Robert Brady: A Survey Exhibition by Essayists, Thomas H. Garver, John Fitz Gibbon on Mullen Books.” Mullen Books, Crocker Art Museum, www.mullenbooks.com/pages/books/126318/essayists-thomas-h-garver-john-fitz-gibbon/robert-brady-a-survey-exhibition.
 “Interviews and Articles.” Conversations.org: Interview: Robert Brady, by Richard Whittaker, www.conversations.org/story.php?sid=96.
 Koplos, Janet, and Bruce Metcalf. Makers: a History of American Studio Craft. University of North Carolina Press, 2010.
 “Robert Brady.” Stremmel Gallery, stremmelgallery.com/artists/robert-brady/.
 “Robert Brady.” American Craft Council, craftcouncil.org/recognition/robert-brady.
 “Robert D. Brady, Robert Brady.” Brady | The Marks Project, www.themarksproject.org/marks/brady.
 Squarecylinder.com, www.squarecylinder.com/2010/12/artist-profile-robert-brady.
 Wechsler, Susan. The Raw Edge: Ceramics of the '80s. Hillwood Art Gallery, Long Island University, 1983.
 Writer, Jesse Hamlin Chronicle Staff. “Robert Brady's Art of Nuance and Gesture / Sculptor's Works Have a Primitive Quality.” SFGate, 15 Nov. 2002, www.sfgate.com/entertainment/article/Robert-Brady-s-art-of-nuance-and-gesture-2770717.php.

Footnotes 

1946 births
Living people
University of California, Davis alumni
Artists from Sacramento, California
Modern sculptors
American ceramists
20th-century ceramists
21st-century ceramists
20th-century American sculptors
20th-century American male artists
American male sculptors
Sculptors from California